Downtown Transit Center is a bus and light rail transportation center in Downtown Houston, Texas, United States, operated by the Metropolitan Transit Authority of Harris County, Texas (METRO). It includes an island platformed METRORail light rail station and bays for bus service.

The station was opened on January 1, 2004.

The station is located adjacent to the Lee P. Brown Administration Building, the METRO headquarters. The bus bay has parking space for nine buses.

Routes that go through the Downtown Transit Center include:
 METRORAIL Red Line
6 - Jensen/Greens
11 - Almeda/Lyons
32 - Renwick/San Felipe
44 - Acres Homes
51 - Hardy/Kelley
52 - Hardy/Ley
54 - Scott
82 - Westheimer
85 - Antoine/Washington
102 - Bush IAH Express
108 - Veterans Memorial Express
137 - Northshore Express
160 - Memorial City Express
161 - Wilcrest Express
162 - Memorial Express
291 - Conroe Park & Ride

Gallery

References

External links

Downtown Transit Center

METRORail stations
Railway stations in the United States opened in 2004
2004 establishments in Texas
Railway stations in Harris County, Texas